D&G usually refers to Dolce and Gabbana, an Italian fashion house.

D&G may also refer to:
 Dumfries and Galloway, a region in Scotland
 Desnoes & Geddes, a Jamaican beverage company
 Deleuze and Guattari, a philosopher duo
 D&G Bus, a local bus company in England